Rora may refer to:
Rora (name)
Rora, a village administered by the city of Sighișoara, Mureș County, Romania
Rora, Aberdeenshire, a rural settlement in Aberdeenshire, Scotland
Rora, a diminutive of the Russian feminine first name Avrora (a form of Aurora)
Rorà, a municipality in Piedmont, Italy
Røra, a village in Nord-Trøndelag County, Norway
RORA, RAR-related orphan receptor alpha, a gene / protein